

The Howard DGA-18 was an American two-seat basic training aircraft designed and built by the Howard Aircraft Corporation for the United States Civil Pilot Training Program.

Design
The DGA-18 was a low-wing cantilever monoplane with two tandem open cockpits and a fixed conventional landing gear. The aircraft was built in three variants with different engines fitted.

Variants
DGA-18 (or DGA-125)
Variant powered by a  Warner Scarab 50 radial engine.
DGA-18K (or DGA-160)
Variant powered by a  Kinner R-5 radial engine.
DGA-18W (or DGA-145)
Variant powered by a  Warner Super Scarab radial engine.

Specifications (DGA-18)

References

Notes

Bibliography

1940s United States civil trainer aircraft
DGA-18
Low-wing aircraft
Single-engined tractor aircraft
Aircraft first flown in 1941